The 2012–13 Texas–Pan American Broncs men's basketball team represented the University of Texas–Pan American during the 2012–13 NCAA Division I men's basketball season. This was head coach Ryan Mark's fourth season at UTPA. The Broncs played their home games at the UTPA Fieldhouse and were members of the Great West Conference. They finished the season 16–16. 5–3 in Great West play to finish in second place. They lost in the semifinals of the Great West tournament to Chicago State. On March 18, head coach Ryan Marks was fired after posting a record of 39–89 in four seasons.

This was the Broncs last season in the Great West. The Broncs will join the Western Athletic Conference for the 2013–14 season.

Roster

Schedule and results
Source

|-
!colspan=9 style="background:#006600; color:#FF6600;"| Regular season

|-
!colspan=9 style="background:#006600; color:#FF6600;"| 2013 Great West tournament

References

UT Rio Grande Valley Vaqueros men's basketball seasons
Texas-Pan American